Kurtziella cerina is a species of small, predatory sea snail, a marine gastropod mollusk in the family Mangeliidae.

Description
The length of the shell attains 10 mm.

The shell is yellowish white; the columella is sometimes tinged with black. The surface is covered by very fine revolving lines crossing the ribs, producing a rasplike minor sculpture.

Distribution
K. cerina can be found in Northwest Atlantic waters, ranging from the coast of Massachusetts to the Campeche Bank. and in the Gulf of Mexico and the Caribbean Sea.

It has also been found as a fossil in Quaternary strata in several states along the eastern coast of the US

References

 Abbott, R.T. (1974). American Seashells. 2nd ed. Van Nostrand Reinhold: New York, NY (USA). 663 pp
 Rosenberg, G., F. Moretzsohn, and E. F. García. 2009. Gastropoda (Mollusca) of the Gulf of Mexico, Pp. 579–699 in Felder, D.L. and D.K. Camp (eds.), Gulf of Mexico–Origins, Waters, and Biota. Biodiversity. Texas A&M Press, College Station, Texas

External links
  Tucker, J.K. 2004 Catalog of recent and fossil turrids (Mollusca: Gastropoda). Zootaxa 682:1–1295.
 

cerina
Gastropods described in 1851